Johan Erik Daniel Holmqvist (born May 24, 1978) is a Swedish former professional ice hockey goaltender, he most notably played in the National Hockey League and the Swedish Hockey League (SHL).

Playing career
He started his career in the Elitserien team Brynäs IF. He played for their senior team from 1996 to 2000, winning a Swedish championship in 1999. He then signed with the New York Rangers, who had drafted Holmqvist in the 1997 NHL Entry Draft (7th round/175 pick overall). Holmqvist played four NHL games for the Rangers between 2000 and 2003. Most of his time was spent with the Rangers' farm team Hartford Wolf Pack of the AHL.

On March 11, 2003, Holmqvist was traded to Minnesota Wild for Lawrence Nycholat. Holmqvist played the rest of the season with the Wild's farm team, the Houston Aeros of the AHL, and won the Jack A. Butterfield Trophy as MVP of the Calder Cup Playoffs as Houston won the league championship. The following season, 2003/04, he played with the Aeros. At the end of the season, he decided to move back to Sweden where signed with his former club, Brynäs IF.

He played with them for two seasons and then, on June 1, 2006, he signed with the Tampa Bay Lightning, an NHL club. He played with them for almost two years, putting up mixed numbers. He was traded at the 2008 trade deadline to the Dallas Stars along with Brad Richards for Mike Smith, Jeff Halpern and Jussi Jokinen. On July 23, 2008, he signed a contract with the Swedish club Frölunda HC.

International play

Holmqvist has represented Sweden in two World Championships, 2005 and 2006. He was Sweden's starting goaltender in 2006 and lead Sweden to their first gold medal in a World Championship since 1998, for which he was selected as the tournament's best goaltender.

Career statistics

Regular season and playoffs

International

References

External links

1978 births
Living people
Brynäs IF players
Charlotte Checkers (1993–2010) players
Dallas Stars players
Frölunda HC players
Hartford Wolf Pack players
Houston Aeros (1994–2013) players
New York Rangers draft picks
New York Rangers players
People from Tierp Municipality
Swedish expatriate ice hockey players in the United States
Swedish ice hockey goaltenders
Tampa Bay Lightning players
Tierps HK players
Sportspeople from Uppsala County